Thịt bò nướng lá lốt ("grilled beef, in lolot leaf") or thịt bò lá lốt ("beef, leaf of lolot"), bò nướng lá lốt is a dish consisting of Vietnamese beef in lolot leaves, which are called "betel" leaves by some English magazines. The leaves smell spicy but have a medicinal taste. The food is often served or sold at barbecues, and is the 5th out of 7 courses in the multi-course meal Bò 7 món. There is a northern version called chả lá lốt using pork instead of beef and often pan-fried instead of grilled.

In Southern Vietnam, the lolot leaf is also called lá lốp.

Bo la lot is often topped with crushed roasted peanuts and green onions, or served with lettuce, mint leaves, daikon and carrot pickles, and vermicelli noodles, dipped in nứơc mắm pha (Vietnamese dipping sauce).

See also
Lolot leaf, plant

References

Vietnamese cuisine
Stuffed vegetable dishes
Beef dishes